Samir Alhafith is an Australian technical diver, cave explorer and underwater filmmaker.

Alhafith was born in Baghdad, Iraq, and moved to Australia as a teenager. He began diving in 1995, and has gone on to become one of the countries leading exponents of rebreather technology, helping to discover and identify several World War II wrecks between Sydney and the Victorian border.

Alhafith won the 2007 Oztek Diver of the Year Award in recognition of his wreck exploration efforts both at home and abroad. He is also an active writer on the subject of deep technical diving in diving related publications, and a regular columnist in "Dive Log Australasia" Magazine.

References

Year of birth missing (living people)
Living people
Australian explorers
Australian non-fiction writers
Australian underwater divers
Iraqi emigrants to Australia
Underwater filmmakers
Writers from Baghdad